Adèle Romany or Marie Jeanne Romanée (7 December 1769 – 6 June 1846) was a French painter.

Biography
Romany was the illegitimate daughter of the marquis de Romance, and born into a wealthy family. She was a pupil of Jean-Baptiste Regnault and is known for miniatures and portraits, especially those of people involved in performing arts. In 1790 she married the miniature painter François Antoine Romany (they later divorced). She exhibited her works from 1793 to 1808 under the name Romany in the Paris Salon, but from 1808 to 1833 under the name Romanée. In 1808, she won a gold medal of the jury.

Romany died in Paris.

Gallery

References

External links 

1769 births
1846 deaths
19th-century French painters
French women painters
French portrait painters
Portrait miniaturists
19th-century French women artists
Painters from Paris